The Living Building Challenge is an international sustainable building certification program created in 2006 by the non-profit International Living Future Institute. It is described by the Institute as a philosophy, advocacy tool and certification program that promotes the measurement of sustainability in the built environment. It can be applied to development at all scales, from buildings—both in new constructions and renovations—to infrastructure, landscapes, neighborhoods, both urban and rural communities, and differs from other green certification schemes such as LEED or BREEAM.

Intention
The end goal of the Living Building Challenge is to encourage the creation of a regenerative built environment. The challenge is an attempt "to raise the bar for building standards from doing less harm to contributing positively to the environment." It "acts to rapidly diminish the gap between current limits and the end-game positive solutions we seek" by pushing architects, contractors, and building owners out of their comfort zones.

Flower metaphor 

The Living Building Challenge employs the use of a flower metaphor for the framework. According to founder Jason F. McLennan, flowers are an accurate representation of a truly regenerative building which receives all of its energy from the sun, nutrients from the soil, and water from the sky. Similar to a flower, they simultaneously shelter other organisms and support the surrounding ecosystem. They also serve as beauty and inspiration and adapt to their surroundings. Meanwhile, the petals of the flower represent each performance area in the framework. These petals include Materials, Place, Water, Energy, Health and Happiness, Equity, and Beauty.

Performance areas
Living Building Challenge comprises seven performance areas: site, water, energy, health and happiness, materials, equity and beauty. Each performance area has its own intention and are subdivided into a total of twenty Imperatives, each of which focuses on a specific sphere of influence.

Place 
This petal is created with the purpose to have designers analyze the location of a site and the impacts the construction will have on the nearby environment and society before being built and during its operation. It focuses on creating a connected community that is more pedestrian focused, protecting and restoring existing nature, and encouraging a healthy level of density.

Water 
This petal directly addresses the scarcity of water. A certified building is required to be designed to only use the amount of water that can be harvested onsite and purify the water without the use of chemicals. Projects achieving this petal often employ rainwater catchment cisterns, greywater or closed-loop systems, compostable toilets, and other techniques to reduce and recycle water.

Energy 
This petal focuses on the reduction and efficiency of energy by requiring the building to produce on-site 105% of the energy it needs year round. It also aims to shift the grid the building is connected to towards more renewable energy.

Health and happiness 
This petal focuses on improving on the source of health problems such as indoor air quality, thermal comfort, visual comfort, and integration of nature in order to increase the quality of human health and productivity. Projects often employ biophilic design, daylighting, operable windows, and other techniques to achieve this petal.

Materials 
This petal's intention is to focus on eliminating the use of construction materials that have adverse environmental, health, and social impacts. These impacts include pollution, resource depletion, habitat loss, deforestation, toxic chemical use, and large embodied energy use. The goal is to push the industry towards transparency and transform extraction and production practices. This is done by requiring projects to avoid all materials on the Red List, and to report all materials used and their manufacturer and extraction information. Additionally, projects achieve this petal by creating a materials conservation management plan, using salvaged materials, tracking the location sources of the project's materials, using products with Declare labels, among other tasks.

Equity 
This petal aims to change society's mindset in which property ownership allows owners to externalize negative environmental impacts onto others. This is done by creating spaces where people of all capabilities, disabilities, ages, and economic status have equal access.  It also requires that the project must not disturb another site's access to sunlight, fresh air, and clean water.

Beauty 
Lastly, the Beauty petal focuses on encouraging project teams to put in genuine and thoughtful efforts into beautifying the project. Although beauty is not subjectively defined in the framework, it is stressed that beauty should be a goal in order to inspire and elevate the lives of the occupants, visitors, and neighbors.

Process 
Certification is based on actual, rather than modeled or anticipated, performance. Therefore, projects must be operational for at least 12 consecutive months prior to evaluation. Types of projects which can be certified include but are not limited to existing or new buildings, single-family residential, multi-family residential, institutional buildings (government, education, research, or religious), commercial (offices, hospitality, retail), and medical or laboratory buildings. There are 3 certification pathways, Living Building Certification, Petal Certification, and Zero Energy Certification a project can pursue, all of which are awarded on performance.

Types of certification

Living Building Certification 
This is full certification where projects have achieved all imperatives applicable to their typology (see Table 1 for this breakdown). Projects must meet all assigned Imperatives and have proven performance through at least 12 consecutive months of operation.

The table below shows the breakdown of each petal and each building type's required imperatives:

Note: All imperatives are required unless "not required" is listed in the cell. If a project has scale jumping applicable for an imperative, the imperative is still required. Scale Jumping allows multiple buildings or projects to operate in a cooperative state – sharing green infrastructure as appropriate and allowing for Living Building, Site or Community status to be achieved as elegantly and efficiently as possible. This table is updated to reflect Living Building Challenge Version 3.1.

Table 1: Breakdown of required imperatives for project typologies

Petal Certification 
This is a certification that is awarded to a project if it achieves at least 3 complete petals (with all of the petal's applicable imperatives) out of the 7 total petals. One of the 3 completed petals must be the Energy, Water, or Materials petal. In addition, regardless of completed petals, imperatives "Limits to Growth" and "Inspiration and Education" must be achieved.

Net Zero Energy Certification 
The certification and International Living Future Institute's definition of a net zero building as:

"One hundred percent of the building's energy needs on a net annual basis must be supplied by on-site renewable energy. No combustion is allowed."

To receive this certification projects must achieve at least four imperatives, "Limits to Growth", "Net Positive Energy" (reduced to one hundred percent), "Beauty + Spirit", and "Inspiration + Education".  The Net Positive Energy imperative's requirements are changed from producing 105% of the building's energy consumption, to 100% so it is only net zero and not net positive.

Certification steps 
In order for a project to achieve certification, it needs to be registered and a registration fee has to be paid according to its typology. The project team then continues documentation for the certification and operation and occupancy for at least 12 consecutive months. During this occupancy and operation, project performance data is measured. After the operation period, the team submits all data and documentation for auditing. The auditing process is performed by an independent third-party. This independent auditor performs a preliminary audit and a final audit where imperative performances are checked with data and extra documentation. During the final audit, the auditors will do another documentation audit along with a site visit of the project and an audit report for the team. If the auditor concludes that the project achieves all of the applicable imperatives and the site visit is satisfactory, the project will be awarded its certification. The first Living BuildingsSM were certified in October 2010, and by March 2013, only six had achieved certification.

Resources for project teams 
Since the design and certification process of a building can bring up many questions and obstacles, there are multiple streams of access for guidance.

The Dialogue 
Only members of registered Living Building Challenge projects can access The Dialogue. It is an online platform that provides a direct path of communication between project teams and the International Living Future Institute's technical staff. Teams can asks questions concerning imperatives, clarifications, temporary exceptions, among other information, and see answers from the staff. The questions and responses help mold future versions of the certification.

Petal handbooks 
The handbooks provide a source of consolidated and clarified rules for meeting the imperatives. They are updated continuously based on new Dialogue posts and innovations made by new Living Building Challenge projects. They are used as reference tools but recommended in conjunction with the Dialogue since they are not always up to date.

Technical assistance 
Other sources of technical assistance include webcasts and workshops hosted by the International Living Future Institute, charrette facilitation by the institute, and LBC collaboratives, where members from different LBC projects can discuss their work and learn from each other.

History
The Living Building Challenge was launched by the Cascadia Green Building Council (a chapter of both the U.S. Green Building Council and Canada Green Building Council). It was created by Jason F. McLennan and Bob Berkebile, of BNIM. McLennan brought the program to Cascadia when he became its CEO in 2006. The International Living Building Institute was created of and by Cascadia in May 2009 to oversee the Living Building Challenge and its auxiliary programs.

The Evolution of the Living Building Standard

Figure 1: Number of Registered Living Building Challenge Projects worldwide from 2006-2017 
It was reported in April 2016 that a total of 331 registered Living Building Challenge projects yielded a total of 14.1 million square feet of registered total floor area. According to the International Living Future Institute, as of May 2017 there are 380 registered projects.

International Living Future Institute
The International Living Future Institute is a non-governmental organization (NGO) committed to catalyzing a global transformation toward true sustainability.  The Institute seeks partnerships with leaders in the public, private and not-for-profit sectors in pursuit of a future that is socially just, culturally rich and ecologically restorative.

The Institute is the umbrella organization for the Living Building Challenge and the Cascadia Green Building Council, along with The Natural Step US and Ecotone Publishing.

Application

Example of use 
The Old Oak Dojo in Jamaica Plain, Boston, MA, USA, is an example of a certified Living (full certification) project. Certified in 2016, the dojo serves as a multi-purpose space for community members to host educational events, fitness classes, or just gather to eat or celebrate. The project employs technology such as water cisterns, radiant heating in the floor, operable windows, stack effect, energy recovery ventilator, composting toilets, solar energy, and a living roof.

See the table below for descriptions of some of the project team's actions in order to comply with the project's applicable imperatives.

Notable projects 
Over 100 project teams are pursuing the Challenge, most of which have officially registered with the Institute. As of February 2023 twenty-five buildings have been certified as Living Buildings. Below is a list of some of the projects pursuing or certified under the Challenge.

LBC in building codes 
The Living building challenge has appeared in a publication from the Seattle Department of Construction and Inspections on Seattle's Climate Strategies. According to the publication, these programs allow developers to "request additional departures from the Seattle Land Use Code through Design Review for either. They provide height and floor area incentives for buildings in exchange for meeting high-performance green building requirements.". By achieving certification, the project can build up to 25% more floor area than regulations in certain zones allow, and in some cases more building height. 

In many cases, projects have to request variances or alternative compliance pathways for building codes due to their design choices for the Living Building Challenge. Regulators often require evidence of the proposed performance of the new or innovative materials and technologies LBC project use, which create further obstacles and documentation requirements from project teams.

Criticisms 
Some criticisms from the field include the standard's need for more guidance for teams, the subjectiveness of some imperatives, the need for life cycle analysis, the energy measurement unit to change to carbon emissions, and the lack of regional considerations. In addition, there are criticisms of a project's large number of obstacles due to building code regulations that have not been changing in time to adapt to climate change. In turn, this has caused a decrease in the rate of newly registered Living Building Challenge projects.

References

External links 
 Living Building Challenge website
 International Living Future Institute website
 PNNL Sustainable Building Rating Systems Summary
 ASHRAE Standard for the Design of High Performance, Green Buildings
 Comprehensive Assessment System for Building Environmental Efficiency
 Energy Star
 U.S. Green Building Council
 Green Globes assessment and rating system
 Building Research Establishment's Environmental Assessment Method
 GBTool Overview
 The 2030 Challenge

2006 establishments in the United States
2006 establishments in Canada
Sustainable building
Sustainable building in the United States
Building energy rating
Environment of the United States
Building engineering
Energy in the United States
Environmental design
Sustainable building rating systems